The 13th European Women's Artistic Gymnastics Championships were held in Madrid, Spain on 2–3 May 1981.

Medalists

References 

1981
European Artistic Gymnastics Championships
1981 in European sport
International gymnastics competitions hosted by Spain
1981 in Spanish sport